The Ralli Baronetcy, of Park Street in the City of Westminster, is a title in the Baronetage of the United Kingdom. It was created on 8 February 1912 for Lucas Ralli, head of the firm of Ralli Brothers, who were financiers, shippers, cotton and grain merchants. The Ralli Family are of Greek origin, and are ultimately descended from the Frankish-Byzantine Raoul/Ralles Family. Originally from the Greek island of Chios, due to the Chios massacre the Ralli family was forced to emigrate to the United Kingdom, where they founded the eponymous firm.

The family seat is Panworth Hall Farm near Ashill, Norfolk.

Ralli baronets, of Park Street in the City of Westminster (1912)
Sir Lucas Eustratio Ralli, 1st Baronet (1846–1931)
Sir Eustratio Lucas "Strati" Ralli, 2nd Baronet (1876–1964)
Sir Godfrey Victor Ralli, 3rd Baronet (1915–2010)
Sir David Charles Ralli, 4th Baronet (born 1946)
The heir apparent is Philip Neil David Ralli (born 1983)
Who had mixed twins including a son, Luke Castor Kai Ralli in 2019

Notes

References
 Kidd, Charles, Williamson, David (editors). Debrett's Peerage and Baronetage (1990 edition). New York: St Martin's Press, 1990, Page B 719-720

 
 
 Ralli family from Christopher Long website
 Rallis India company website

External links
Daily Telegraph obituary on Lucas Ralli, second son of Sir Strati Ralli, 2nd Baronet

Baronetcies in the Baronetage of the United Kingdom